SES-16 / GovSat is a geostationary communications satellite designed and manufactured by Orbital ATK; LuxGovSat is a joint venture between SES and Luxembourg government. The satellite was launched by SpaceX on 31 January 2018.

See also 

 SES S.A.
 List of SES satellites

References 

Communications satellites in geostationary orbit
SES satellites
Satellites of Luxembourg
Spacecraft launched in 2018
2018 in Luxembourg
SpaceX commercial payloads
Satellites using the GEOStar bus